Pitrazepin is a competitive GABAA and glycine receptor antagonist. It has been used to study insect and snail nervous systems in scientific research.

See also
 Bicuculline
 Strychnine

References

Convulsants
GABAA receptor antagonists
Glycine receptor antagonists
Piperazines
Triazoles